Dr Herbert Baldwin (1782–1861) was an Irish politician from Cork. He was a Member of Parliament (MP) from 1832 to 1837.

At the 1830 general election, Baldwin stood as a candidate for Cork City, but did not won a seat.  The available sources do not record the party affiliation of candidates before 1832, but when Baldwin next stood for Parliament, at the 1832 general election, it was for the newly formed Repeal Association.  Seeking repeal of the Act of Union 1800, which had created the United Kingdom of Great Britain and Ireland, the repealers won both seats in Cork City. At the next general election, in January 1835, both Baldwin and his fellow repealer Daniel Callaghan were defeated by Conservative candidates. However, the election was overturned on petition, and in April the seats were awarded to Baldwin and Callaghan.

Baldwin did not contest the 1837 general election.

References

External links 
 

1782 births
1861 deaths
Members of the Parliament of the United Kingdom for Cork City
UK MPs 1832–1835
UK MPs 1835–1837
Irish Repeal Association MPs